Igor Štromajer (born December 29, 1967 in Maribor, Slovenia) is a multimedia artist who describes himself as "an intimate mobile communicator".

His work Intima is a web-based fictional biography of an astronaut.

See also
Intima Virtual Base

References

Sources

External links
 Exhibit at Le Centre national d'art et de Culture Georges Pompidou
 Bio details at Hamburger Kunsthalle
 Intima Virtual Base – www.intima.org
 Review of works including Stromajer's by Josephine Bosma

Artists from Maribor
New media artists
Living people
1967 births